George Roy Crick (3 April 1904 – 19 August 1966) was an Australian politician.

He was born at Nurcoung to grazier George Arnold Crick and Mary Cousen Keeping. He attended school at Sunshine and became a carpenter. On 26 June 1927 he married Gladys Sophie Day, with whom he had two children. From 1942 he was an official with the Sheetmetal Workers' Union, and also secretary of the Sunshine branch of the Labor Party. During World War II he was a sergeant in the Volunteer Defence Corps. In 1955 he was elected to the Victorian Legislative Assembly as the member for Grant. He served until his death at Footscray in 1966.

References

1904 births
1966 deaths
Australian Labor Party members of the Parliament of Victoria
Members of the Victorian Legislative Assembly
20th-century Australian politicians
Volunteer Defence Corps soldiers